Dipankar Dipon (born 22 May 1976) is a Bangladeshi film director and screenwriter who works in Dhallywood. His first feature film was cop thriller Dhaka Attack (2017), which won four National Film Award in 2017 including Best Film, Best Actor, Best Sound, and Best Make-up. Since 1998, he made one feature film, One web content, 30 TV movies and telefilms, 25 TV serials, 40 short TV video fictions, 48 live-action films for sesame street Bangladesh, 2 short films, and 12 documentaries.

Early life
Dipon as Dipankar Sen Gupta was born in 1976 in Rangpur, Bangladesh. His father is Sunil Sen Gupta and his mother is Ranjeeta Sen Gupta. He started off his television career with Shwapnoghuri in 2002, while he was studying at the Dramatics Department of Jahangirnagar University. After making tele-fictions for nearly ten years, Dipon worked with renowned Indian filmmaker Anurag Kashyap in Mumbai for two years, starting from 2012.

Education
HSC & SSC Carmichael College, Rangpur; Government Science College, Dhaka; Setabganj Pilot High school, Setabganj, Dinajpur.
B.A in Drama & Dramatics from Jahangirnagar University, Dhaka, Bangladesh (2000).
M.A. in Drama & Dramatics from Jahangirnagar University, Dhaka, Bangladesh (2002).

Career

Dipon started his career in 1998. His first feature film Dhaka Attack (first police action thriller movie in Bangladesh) released in 2017 and broke the record of 21 years of business of non-festival movies in Bangladesh. He worked with AKFPL (Anurag Kashyap Film Production Limited) in Mumbai from 2012 - 2014. He was a senior scriptwriter in Phantom Films at Mumbai from 2012 to 2014. He was the Live-Action Director at Sesame Workshop under Asiatic since 2008–2012. As a creative director, he made many different kind of socio-economic and factual documentaries for many leading organizations, i.e. UNICEF, UNFPA, UNHCR, PLAN, Marie Stopes – Bangladesh, etc.

Writer and director
Dipon was the director of a child drama named Gupi Gyen Bagha Byen in Sonali Nattya Ghosthi, Setabganj, Dinajpur, which has been staged in International Theater Festival in Katak, Orissa, India in November 2003. He was the writer and director of a short stage drama named Nichak Galpa Noi in Rangpur Padatik in December 2002, which has been staged in Rangpur. He directed a child drama named Prajanma Agami in Sonali Nattya Ghosthi, Setabganj, Dinajpur which has been staged in the National child drama festival in Public Library, Dhaka in June 2002. He was the writer and director of a child drama based on child rights named Ora Hotel Sramik in Sonali Nattya Ghosthi, Setabganj, Dinajpur in May 2000 which has been staged 6 times in Setabganj and Dinajpur. He was an actor of many dramas such as Banapangshul, Oedipus, Korotir Kathakata, Sakuntala, Biday Avishap, Shesher Kabita, A Doll's House, Mrichakatikam, Sri Krisna Kirtan, Kando Nadi Kando in Jahangirnagar University Inter Hall Drama Festival & Academic Production of Dept. of Drama & Dramatics, Jahangirnagar University.

Filmography

Film

Web

Television 

TV Series

TV Short Film

Short Film

Docudrama

Documentaries

Awards and honors

In 2007, Dipon participated Talent campus with his short film in International Film Festival, Berlin, Germany, and also he had an exclusive project in the Berlinale Talent Project market as an only Bangladeshi Film Maker. For his film “Dhaka Attack” he won the award for best film for National Film Awards 2017 by Information Ministry of Bangladesh.
December 2018: ATN Best film director for Movie Dhaka Attack. 
February 2013: RTV-Diamond world star award for Best Director (TV serial category) for TV serial COLLEGE ROAD.
April 2009: Charuniram TV drama award for Best Drama for the TV Drama GOLDEN RATIO
May 2008: Peoples theatre association award for Best Director of the year for the stage Drama (Gupi gyen Bagha Byen)

Berlinale film project
Dipankar Dipon joined in Talent Campus of Berlinale film project in 2006 with his short film Children on a Rainy Day. He is a rare talent in talent campus who had a very prestigious project in Talent Project Market in Berlinale co-production Market in 2006. His Film Project Janani was in 17 from 227 entries. Janani was a futuristic film based on Dhaka's overpopulation.

National Film Awards of Bangladesh
Bengali Cinema Dhaka Attack directed by Dipankar Dipon won four national awards in 2017 including Best Film, Best Actor, Best Makeup, and Best Sound.

References

External links
 

1976 births
Living people
Bangladeshi film directors
Bangladeshi screenwriters
Jahangirnagar University alumni
Carmichael College alumni